Nicolás Santiago Keenan (born 6 May 1997) is an Argentine field hockey player who plays as a midfielder or forward for Dutch Hoofdklasse club Klein Zwitserland and the Argentine national team.

Club career
Keenan started playing hockey for Ciudad de Buenos Aires in Argentina. He played for Club Egara in Spain from his twelfth to his eighteenth. After the 2016 Junior World Cup he moved to the Netherlands to play for Klein Zwitserland.

International career
Keenan had the opportunity to represent Spain but he chose for Argentina. He made his debut for the senior national team in the 2019 FIH Pro League. In July 2019, he was selected in the Argentina squad for the 2019 Pan American Games. They won the gold medal by defeating Canada 5-2 in the final. On 25 June 2021, he was chosen to represent Argentina at the 2020 Summer Olympics. He made his World Cup debut at the 2023 Men's FIH Hockey World Cup.

Honours

Club
Klein Zwitserland
 Gold Cup: 2021–22

International
Argentina U21
 Pan American Junior Championship: 2016

Argentina
 Pan American Games gold medal: 2019

References

External links

1997 births
Living people
Field hockey players from Buenos Aires
Male field hockey midfielders
Male field hockey forwards
Argentine male field hockey players
Field hockey players at the 2019 Pan American Games
Field hockey players at the 2020 Summer Olympics
Pan American Games gold medalists for Argentina
Pan American Games medalists in field hockey
HC Klein Zwitserland players
Men's Hoofdklasse Hockey players
Club Egara players
Expatriate field hockey players
Argentine expatriate sportspeople in the Netherlands
Medalists at the 2019 Pan American Games
Olympic field hockey players of Argentina
2023 Men's FIH Hockey World Cup players
21st-century Argentine people